American rapper 50 Cent has been featured in 88 music videos, 31 television programs, 25 films, and 4 video games.

Filmography

Film

Television

Video games

Music videos

As lead artist

As featured artist

See also 
 50 Cent albums discography
 50 Cent singles discography

References

External links 
 

Male actor filmographies
American filmographies
Videographies of American artists